Rolf Frank Krueger (born December 8, 1946) is a former professional American football defensive tackle in the National Football League. He played six seasons for the St. Louis Cardinals and the San Francisco 49ers. He is the brother of Charlie Krueger (b.1937); they were teammates in 1972 and 1973 with the 49ers.

External links

1946 births
Living people
People from Caldwell, Texas
Players of American football from Texas
American football defensive ends
American football defensive tackles
Texas A&M Aggies football players
St. Louis Cardinals (football) players
San Francisco 49ers players